Father Allan MacDonald (Scottish Gaelic Maighstir Ailein, An t-Athair Ailean Dòmhnallach) (25 October 1859, Fort William, Scotland – 8 October 1905, Eriskay) was a Roman Catholic priest, radically innovative poet in the Scottish Gaelic language, folklorist, and activist for Crofter's rights, free elections, and against religious discrimination in the Gàidhealtachd.

Decades after his death in 1905, Fr. MacDonald's poetry was tracked down and published for the first time by John Lorne Campbell. Also, the sources of every hymn in the priest-poet's 1893 Gaelic hymnal and the degree to which Fr. MacDonald's folklore and folksong research was plagiarized by other writers was also meticulously documented by John Lorne Campbell. Furthermore, literary scholar Ronald Black praised Fr. MacDonald in 2002 as, "a huge literary talent", and as the founder of modernist poetry in Scottish Gaelic. Black has also written that Fr. MacDonald's prophetic poem Ceum nam Mìltean ("The March of Thousands") deserves to be, "first in any anthology of the poetry of the First World War", and, "would not have been in any way out of place, with regard to style or substance", in Sorley MacLean's groundbreaking 1943 Symbolist poetry collection Dàin do Eimhir. Black concluded by commenting that had Fr. Allan MacDonald not died prematurely at the age of only 45, "then the map of Gaelic literature in the twentieth century might have looked very different."

Ancestry
Although born in humble circumstances, the future poet, similarly to Iain Lom, Sìleas na Ceapaich, and Allan The Ridge MacDonald, could trace his descent back to Somerled, King Robert the Bruce, and Alasdair Carrach (d. c.1440), 1st Chief of Clan MacDonald of Keppoch.

Raghnall Mòr (d. 1547) the 7th Chief of Keppoch, fathered an illegitimate son by an unnamed weaver woman of Clan Cameron, Iain Dubh MacDhòmhnaill (John MacDonald, 1st of Bohuntine). Their son became the first Keppoch tacksman of Bohuntine and the poet's ancestor.

During the Battle of Boloyne against Clan Cameron in 1554, Alexander MacDonald, 8th of Keppoch, was wounded in the fray. In response, the Chief's half-brother, Iain Dubh MacDhòmhnaill of Bohuntine, took de facto command of the Keppoch forces and oversaw the defeat of the Camerons and the death and dismemberment of their Chief upon the battlefield.

Fr. Allan's close kinsman and fellow Gaelic poet Allan The Ridge MacDonald famously celebrated this event and much of the subsequent proud warrior history of the MacDonalds of Bohuntine in the Canadian Gaelic song-poem Sliochd an Taighe ("The Family of the Household"), which was composed on a homestead near Mabou, Nova Scotia and set to the air Mìos deireannach an Fhoghair.

In commenting on their shared lineage, literary historian Effie Rankin has argued that Fr. Allan MacDonald and Ailean a' Ridse MacDhòmhnaill, "may rightfully be regarded as the foremost Keppoch bards of the nineteenth century."

The poet's father, John MacDonald (1821–1873), was born into a family of carters near Grantown-on-Spey and was employed for many years by the General Post Office as a heavily armed guard dressed in maroon and gold livery, whose orders were to defend the "Marquess of Breadalbane" Royal Mail Coach from highwaymen along the route between Fort William, Glencoe, Blackmount, and Glasgow.

In a 27 October 1933 letter to the Stornoway Gazette, Skye-born Seanchaidh John N. MacLeod (1880–1954), who was fully versed in the oral traditions of Lochaber, explained about Iain Ailein Òg,

"He was closely aquainted with everyone whom he would meet along the long and difficult road that used to wend its way through those bounds at that time, and many a person was regaled by him with old lore and tales that lightened their journey for them."

After marrying Margaret MacPherson, a Strathspey shepherd's daughter and descendant of Clan MacPherson, in Fort William on 21 November 1852, John MacDonald saved enough money to buy an inn and a pub at 179 High Street in Fort William, formerly, Lochaber, Scotland.

Early life

Fr. Allan MacDonald, the third surviving child of his parents, was born in an upper room of his father's inn on 25 October 1859. He was named after his recently deceased paternal grandfather, Allan MacDonald (1782–1859).

Fr. MacDonald later recalled how, during his early life, both the town of Fort William and the surrounding countryside had undergone a language shift from Gaelic to Highland English. He accordingly described the Fort William of his childhood as, "half Lowland and half Highland."

He later told Amy Murray that he considered his loss, in having grown up without the oral literature and bardic poetry taught in the Ceilidh houses of the Gàidhealtachd, to be irreparable. Despite being repeatedly told otherwise, he considered himself to be permanently crippled as both a seanchaidh and a traditional singer. He concluded, "I would give anything if I had been born fifteen miles to the westward."

According to Roger Hutchinson, Fr. MacDonald's later statements about the complete Anglicisation of Fort William during his childhood were an exaggeration. Census records from the era reveal that 70% of Fort William's population reported the ability to speak both the English and Gaelic languages. At the same time, however, English was the language of commerce and was seen as a means of future advancement. For these reasons, John and Margaret MacDonald, being innkeepers, had made a choice to teach only English to their children.

At the same time, Fr. Allan's lifelong fascination with the Scottish folklore of the Highlands and Islands, an interest his father also shared, began as a child in Fort William. He later told Amy Murray about how deeply he believed as a child in local stories about the each-uisge, or "water horse", of nearby Loch Linnhe, whose back could magically expand in order to accommodate all the children who wished to ride him. But then, the water-horse would gallop off into the nearest lake to drown and eat the children on his back. Fr. Allan later recalled, "Many's the horse I wouldn't get on as a child for fear it would be the each-uisge."

Seminary studies

Blair's College
On 15 August 1871, 12-year old Allan MacDonald entered the minor seminary at Blair's College in Aberdeen, which had been founded in 1829 to rebuild the Catholic Church in Scotland after Catholic Emancipation ended centuries of religious persecution. At the time he arrived, the future Gaelic poet and scholar spoke only English.

According to the 1871 national census, which was taken only a few months before Allan MacDonald's arrival, Blair's College consisted of 49 seminarians, a Rector, a Procurator, three professors, a housekeeper, a cook, and twelve maids recruited from nearby villages.

According to John Lorne Campbell, both living conditions and discipline were very spartan at Blair's College during the 1870s. So much so, that Fr. MacDonald often said in later years that, after what he had experienced at Blair's College, all the hardships of being a priest in the Outer Hebrides looked luxurious by comparison.

According to his biographer Roger Hutchinson, Fr. Allan MacDonald would maintain, "a cordial dislike", of the Blair's College Rector, Fr. Peter Joseph Grant, for the remainder of his life. For example, in a Gaelic poem Rannan do Mgr Mac an Tòisich ("Verses to Fr John MacIntosh of Bornish"), addressed three decades later to a seminary friend, Fr. MacDonald recalled the Blair's College Rector as, "that ghastly man called Grant". Fr. MacDonald further expressed disgust at how Fr. Grant used, "to make our pens scratch hard", every Tuesday and Wednesday evening before feeding his desperately hungry students their porridge. Fr. MacDonald added, "All the same to him were Latin, English, or a thousand lines of that monster Homer!"

His other instructors included Fr. James A. Smith, the future Archbishop of St Andrews and Edinburgh. The main linguistic focus was upon the study of Ecclesiastical Latin. Seminarians who wished to also learn Gaelic, were given Fr. Ewen MacEachen's Gaelic dictionary and his literary translation of Thomas a Kempis's Imitatio Christi as textbooks. They were then encouraged to pursue their studiy of Gaelic on their own time. According to John Lorne Campbell, however, the careful study of Latin and Koine Greek had already well prepared the seminarians of Blair's College to acquire additional languages and many were very successful at learning Gaelic using this method.

Allan MacDonald's acquisition of the language was also helped by the many native Gaelic-speakers among the seminarians of Blair's, including the aforementioned John MacIntosh. MacIntosh, who was a native of Roybridge in Lochaber, was very much an outdoorsman compared with Allan MacDonald and was known for his prowess as a hunter, fiddler, and shinty player. Following his own ordination and assignment to Bornish, South Uist, Fr. MacIntosh would become known as, "The Big Priest of the Horses".

Other languages that were taught included French, Spanish, and Italian, which were intended to prepare the seminarians at Blair's for further studies at the Scots Colleges in Paris, Douai, Rome, and Valladolid. Geography was also taught using a globe, as were, "philosophy in all its branches", and theology.

At the same time, though, both of Allan MacDonald's parents died during his studies at Blair's College. Iain Ailein Òg died at his Fort William hotel of tuberculosis and chronic gastritis on 25 March 1873. He was only 58 years old. His widow, 45-year old Margaret MacPherson MacDonald, also died at Fort William of pulmonary congestion on 20 December 1875. The surviving MacDonald siblings immediately left home and dispersed. 12-year old Elizabeth "Lizzie" MacDonald was taken in by her maternal great-uncle Alexander MacIntosh, who had similarly taken in her fatherless mother three decades earlier. After completing school in Fort William, Elizabeth MacDonald joined her older sister Charlotte MacDonald as a domestic servant in Glasgow. Their teenaged brother Ronald MacDonald moved to Glenshiel in Lochalsh, where he began working as a hired farm hand.

Valladolid
In September 1876, Allan MacDonald was advised by his professors to continue his priestly training at the Royal Scots College, which had been founded in Madrid by Colonel William Semple of Lochwinnoch and his wife, Doña María de Ledesma in 1627, as a major seminary for the illegal and underground Catholic Church in Scotland. Allan MacDonald began the journey to Spain shortly before his seventeenth birthday.

Since being reopened by Rector John Geddes at Valladolid in 1771, the Royal Scots College had been located inside a three-storey 18th-century tenement located on a wide street just to the south of the city center. The windows were always kept shuttered as men on the street outside led donkey carts back and forth from the main plaza.

In September 1876, Allan MacDonald arrived at Valladolid after a railway journey via Paris and Bordeaux. Valladolid was once again nominally at peace following local battles and skirmishes of the Second Carlist War and, as a new student, MacDonald would immediately have joined the students and faculty for their autumn break in nearby Boecillo, where the Royal Scots College owned a vineyard.

At the time, the Rector was Fr. John Cowie, a native of Fochabers in Morayshire and longtime professor of Classics, philosophy, and theology under previous Rector Fr. John Cameron. Fr. Cowie, as the Vice-Rector, was considered to be the heir apparent after Fr. Cameron retired, but suffered terribly from, "agonies of self doubt", and had to be encouraged and persuaded by the Church hierarchy to accept the promotion. During his "dutiful and uninspiring" 1873 through 1878 tenure as Rector, Fr. Cowie, according to Roger Hutchinson, "clung like a drowning man to the written and unwritten rules of his predecessor." According to the historian of the Scottish Colleges in Spain, Bishop Maurice Taylor, this was because Fr. Cowie, "had a dread of innovations that might lead to precedents." This led, however, one professor at the Royal Scots College to lament in 1875, "Lord, save us from scrupulous Rectors."

According to a 1906 article for The Celtic Review by his Valladolid friend, Fr. George Henderson, Allan MacDonald understood the necessity for learning Latin, but intensely disliked both Greek, which Fr. Henderson ascribed to Fr. John Cowie's flaws as a teacher, and philosophy, which Henderson commented, "may have been in part his loss, if not his wisdom."

A less negative influence than Fr. Cowie was Inverness-born Fr. James MacDonald, both a specialist in and an enthusiast for the ongoing Neo-Thomistic revival.

Literary scholar John Lorne Campbell, however, would later credit the Royal Scots College's Vice-Rector, Fort William native and native Gaelic-speaker Fr. David MacDonald, with being, "the main influence" upon Allan MacDonald's student life in Spain and his subsequent development. Fr. MacDonald was known for his intense dislike of with what he saw as the excessive strictness of Frs. Cameron and Cowie, which he made no effort to conceal. His battles against both Rectors ultimately resulted, much to the relief of the student body, in Fr. MacDonald's own promotion to Rector, following Fr. John Cowie's death in March 1879. John Lorne Campbell has termed Fr. David MacDonald, "a man remarkable for piety and learning, who spent nearly forty years of his life at the College and improved it greatly."

For example, after the Restoration of the Scottish Catholic hierarchy in 1878, Fr. David MacDonald also set up an experimental Gaelic-language immersion program for students who wished to serve as priests in the newly erected Diocese of Argyll and the Isles. Fr. MacDonald did this not only out of ethnic pride and love for his native language, but due to his awareness that many of his students would be serving parishes with enormous numbers of Scottish Gaelic monoglot speakers.

According to Roger Henderson, "There was therefore from 1878 onwards a vocational purpose to Allan MacDonald's pursuit of fluency in the 'mother tongue' which his parents had 'given over'. In every other way he was a north-west Highlander to his core. He cannot have visualised an ideal future for himself outside the Diocese of Argyll and the Isles. But without fluent Gaelic he could not realistically expect to be posted to such heartlands as Arisaig or the Hebrides. Without Gaelic his future was more likely to lie in some benighted Glasgow parish or among the John Cowie's and Peter Grants of the dour northeast. With Gaelic, the hills and islands of his people beckoned him."

According to John Lorne Campbell, "At Valladolid there were several Highland students and they used to produce a holograph Gaelic magazine, of which at least one copy has been preserved. Fr. Allan contributed to this, apparently under several pseudonyms, for his handwriting appears frequently in the surviving copy."

For the rest of his life, Fr. George Henderson would always treasure a small copy of the Gaelic edition of Thomas a Kempis' Imitatio Christi which Allan MacDonald had given to him during their studies in the Royal Scots College at Valladolid.

In March 1882, a 22-year old Allan MacDonald returned to Scotland after five years in Spain.

At the same time, however, the future poet would always look back with fondness on his years of seminary studies in Spain. In his Gaelic poem Rannan do Mgr Mac an Tòisich ("Verses to Fr John MacIntosh of Bornish"), Fr. MacDonald recalled:

"Thug sinn a greis le chéile san Spáinte, 
Àite nach bu ghann ar sòlas, 
'S bhuain sinn ar dearcag fhìona 
'S chaisg sinn ar miann le h-ùbhlan òrbhuidh', 
'S chan eil teagamh nach do chinn sinn 
An geurad inntinn mar by chòir dhuinn...".

"We spent a while in Spain together, 
A place of no small happiness to us, 
And we plucked the grape of wine, 
And quenched our appetites with oranges. 
There's no doubt that we grew 
In sharpness of mind as was proper for us."

Ordination
Following his return, Allan MacDonald's examiners reported to Archbishop Charles Eyre that they were, "well satisfied, not only with his theoretical knowledge, but also with the prudence and good sense with which he applies this knowledge to particular cases." Allan MacDonald was, in the words of Rector Fr. David MacDonald, "without any canonical impediment, except want of age."

Allan MacDonald was accordingly ordained to the priesthood at St Andrew's Cathedral, Glasgow by Archbishop Eyre on 9 July 1882.

Priestly ministry in Oban
After his ordination, Archbishop Eyre offered Fr. Allan MacDonald a teaching position at Blair's College, which the latter declined.

He was then assigned instead as assistant Rector of St Columba's Cathedral in Oban, which was a temporary wooden pro-cathedral located on the site of the modern Cathedral Hall. Fr. Allan immediately developed a close and long-term friendship with Bishop Angus MacDonald of the Roman Catholic Diocese of Argyll and the Isles.

At the time, the fishermen and shopkeepers of Oban were overwhelmingly Gaelic-speaking, but were religiously a mixture of Presbyterians and Episcopalians. Catholics were a tiny minority and anti-Catholicism in Oban was so intense that Bishop MacDonald is said to have needed an armed bodyguard even to safely stroll around the town during his first years there. The Diocesan See, however, had been placed in Oban anyway, because Oban was, according to the 1882 Ordnance Gazetteer of Scotland, "the capital of the West Highlands and the Charing Cross of the Hebrides."

Roger Hutchinson has accordingly written that, while the Catholics of Oban would have been too few to overwork Fr. Allan MacDonald as a pastor, the language immersion experience there would have done wonders for his Gaelic, which may have been the real reason for not immediately giving him a parish of his own. The anonymous author of an obituary in The Celtic Monthly later recalled that, in Oban, "Father Allan was a veritable son of Anak, being 6ft. 3in. in height, and was known in his communion as the 'high priest.'".

According to John Lorne Campbell, "The only Catholic family then living in the town of Oban itself was that of Donald McLeod, a native of the Isle of Eigg, and from Donald McLeod Fr Allan recovered traditional hymns, some of which were later printed in the hymn book he published in 1893. This was the beginning of an interest in oral tradition to which Fr Allan applied his energies in his spare time for the next seventeen years, taking down the traditional Gaelic oral lore, prayers, hymns, songs, stories, place names, customs and history, whenever he got the chance."

By 1884, Fr. MacDonald's grasp of Gaelic was at last termed adequate enough. After again declining the offer of a faculty position at Blairs College, a 24-year-old Fr. Allan MacDonald was assigned to a parish in the Outer Hebrides and crossed The Minch.

South Uist
He was then assigned to St Peter's Roman Catholic Church in Daliburgh, on the Isle of South Uist, which, according to John Lorne Campbell, was "the most populous, as well as the poorest, island in the Diocese of Argyll and the Isles", which, according to Roger Hutchinson, was "the most impoverished Diocese in Britain."

According to John Lorne Campbell, "Dalibrog in those days could only be reached by steamer from Oban or Glasgow – a full day's sail in the first case. Here Fr Allan landed in July 1884. His congregation was one living on the very margin of existence. Nearly all the best land in the island had been taken, within the preceding three generations, for big sheep farms, and the people had either been evicted or forced, in many cases, to occupy miserable holdings near the shore with a view to pursuing the kelp or fishing industries, the first of which had long ago failed, while very few of them had enough capital to pursue the fishing."

Upon his arrival, Fr Allan MacDonald was mentored in both the local Gaelic dialect and local customs for Catholic feast days by Fr. Alexander Campbell, a retired priest resident at St. Peter's Rectory. Fr. Campbell particularly advised Fr. MacDonald, "There are two kinds of priests that don't get on well with the Islemen. Those who make themselves too friendly, and those who don't make themselves friendly enough."

Fr Allan MacDonald later recalled, "For the first few Sundays after I came to Dalibrog, I went along quietly enough. Then all at once I put a great smoke out of myself in the pulpit; and when the people were going home they were saying to each other, 'There's something in the long-fair man!'"

John Lorne Campbell continues, "The present generation, even in the Isles themselves, can hardly visualise the difficulties involved in the work of a priest in the days before the coming of the motor car, motor boat, the telephone and the telegraph. Fr Allan's parish, about forty square miles, is completely exposed to the wild storms which sweep across the Atlantic... His parishioners were scattered, some villages being only approached by rough tracks... All the duties which fall on the shoulders of a parish priest in a large, poor, scattered and exposed rural parish were on Fr Allan's shoulders: Sunday work, confessions, instructions, sick calls, the repair of Dalibrog Church, the teaching of the children (in which Fr Allan was particularly interested)."

Meanwhile, the island's Anglo-Scottish absentee landlord, Lady Emily Gordon Cathcart, is said to have visited South Uist only once in her life. She refused to spend any money on improvements to the estate, as she feared that doing so might tempt her tenants not to emigrate, as she wished them to do. In her absence, South Uist, "was, like other such estates, ruled by a tight little oligarchy, composed of her factor or agent, the large farmers", and the Church of Scotland ministers. In addition to being the landlord, Lady Cathcart was also the de facto political boss of South Uist and even though Catholics comprised more than 80% of South Uist's population, they were deliberately kept out of local government and the school board, which refused to hire Catholic teachers for the local schools founded under the 1872 Education Act.

Bishop Angus MacDonald, however, cared very deeply, as he once wrote to the Crofter's Commission, about working, "to obtain redress for the people", by urging his priests to lead local chapters of the Highland Land League and activism inspired by that of the Irish Land War.

According to Roger Hutchinson, the Bishop's choice to assign Gaelic-speaking priests from the Scottish mainland to parishes in the Isles was accordingly no accident. About that time, when the Bishop and his priests were the leaders of direct action, rent strikes, and other acts of resistance to the Anglo-Scottish landlords, Fr. Michael MacDonald has since commented, "I think that one of the things that may have influenced the boldness of the priests at that time was simply that they had no relations on the islands who could have been got at by the estate Factor or others."

Therefore, Fr. MacDonald was active in demanding greater rights for the impoverished Crofters who were his parishioners. Fr. MacDonald also began urging his parishioners to vote against the candidates favored by Lady Cathcart and her factor. This was a task which required great tact and, according to John Lorne Campbell, it is very telling that the Protestants of South Uist still speak very highly of Fr. Allan MacDonald.

In June 1886, the absolute power wielded by the Anglo-Scottish landlords was curtailed and the Highland Clearances were ended by the Liberal Party's passage of the Crofters Act of 1886, which according to John Lorne Campbell, was nothing less than "the Magna Carta of the Highlands and Islands, which conferred on the small tenants there something which the peasantry of Scandinavian countries had known for generations..." The Crofter's Act, according to Roger Hutchinson, "legislated for fair rents, compensation for improvements to land and property, and above all for security of tenure to crofters in South Uist, Barra, and everywhere else in the north and west of Scotland. The days of the crofting tenant-at-will were over. There would be -- there could be -- no more mass Clearances from the Highlands. The men of that large region, whatever their language or religion, could after 1886 exercise their right to vote in local and national elections without the threat of serious reprisal." 

Despite this fact, however, Lady Emily Gordon Cathcart was, according to Roger Hutchinson, "an imperious aristocrat... who opposed at every turn her tenants' struggles for security." In his diary, Fr. Allan MacDonald listed some of the ways that Lady Gordon Cathcart and her estate factors could still manipulate the loopholes in the Crofters' Act and find ways to legally evict her tenants en masse.

Even so, in the early spring of 1888, what John Lorne Campbell has termed, "the first school board election in South Uist that can be considered a really free one", finally took place. Fr MacDonald later wrote to Bishop MacDonald that, even though the day of the election had been bitterly cold, only three of the people of Daliburgh parish stayed away from the poll. The result was the election of four Catholics and three Protestants to the school board. Rev. Dr. Roderick MacDonald, the Church of Scotland minister, finished the election at the foot of the other elected members. Fr. MacDonald later wrote to his Bishop, "The manner and bearing of the people was most consoling to one who has been only a few years here. They spoke out manfully and defiantly – a great contrast to the last election."

Eriskay
From the time of his first assignment to Daliburgh, according to Campbell, "Three hundred or so of his congregation of 2300 lived on the Island of Eriskay", "separated from South Uist by half a mile of reef-strewn sea with strong tidal currents. To answer a sick call on Eriskay Fr Allan had to walk six or seven miles, often in the rain, to Eriskay Sound and there make a fire on the shore so that the Eriskay boatmen would know to sail over and fetch him. On one of these crossings he was in danger of being drowned."

However, his health was broken in an epidemic during which MacDonald tirelessly provided the Sacraments to the dying. To assist his recovery, MacDonald was assigned to Eriskay which he immortalised in his poem, Eilein na h-Òige (Isle of Youth). He swiftly earned the love of his parishioners and oversaw the construction of a new parish church, upon "Cnoc nan Sgrath, which dominates the western side of the island and has a beautiful view looking southward over the Sound of Barra and northward to South Uist", and an adjacent rectory.

During a visit to Eriskay, schoolmaster Frederick Rea learned that the people of the island were building the church and rectory with their own hands. They dressed the stones themselves and made their own mortar out of burnt shells and sand. Balks of woods salvaged from wrecked or distressed timber ships was also used. When Rea expressed concern about, "the exposed position", of Cnoc nan Sgrath, Fr. MacDonald, "drew himself to his full height, raised his arms", and exclaimed, "What could be grander? Exposed to the four winds of heaven!"

The fishermen of Eriskay always donated all revenue from the sale of every other Friday's catch to the parish building fund. The fishermen's catch on that day was always a bumper, according to Protestant merchant Ewen MacLennan, who tended the store in the Haun, the main town of Eriskay.

To general rejoicing upon Eriskay, the church was consecrated on 7 May 1903 by Bishop George Smith, and dedicated to St Michael the Archangel, the patron saint of the Outer Hebrides.

In May 1905, Fr. MacDonald wrote to his friend from Royal Scots College, Fr. George Henderson, "I am in better health than when I saw you last, and as happy as a king. The Bishop offered me charge of Fort William, for which I thanked him. I told him I had much sooner stay where I was, and I was left in peace."

Death
According to his death certificate at the General Register Office in Edinburgh, Maighstir Ailein died of pneumonia, pleurisy, and influenza in the bed of his Rectory at 1 o'clock am on 8 October 1905. His younger brother, Ronald MacDonald, who had recently come over from his farm in Glenshiel, was present at his passing. Fr. Allan MacDonald was also survived by his married younger sister, Mrs. Elizabeth. By the 1930s, Elizabeth's daughter, Margaret "Meg" MacInnes, had become well known as a Gaelic traditional singer. Until her death c.1947, MacInnes regularly visited Eriskay, where she was locally regarded as Fr. Allan's heir.

A Tridentine Requiem Mass was offered for his soul at St. Michael's Church by Fr. Allan MacDonald's first cousin, Canon Alexander MacKintosh (1853–1922), who also wrote and published an obituary, "which has provided the basis for all subsequent biography." In 1909, a Celtic High cross was dedicated at Fr. Allan MacDonald's grave in the parish cemetery.

He is still fondly remembered on Barra, South Uist, and Eriskay. In a 1958 article, John Lorne Campbell praised the "sensitivity and scientific detachment" with which Fr. MacDonald had approached the Gaelic oral tradition. Campbell further wrote, "Fr Allan [himself], although possessed of a sense of humour, was a man of austere temperament and disciplined intellect. He was well aquainted with the concreteness of Gaelic oral tradition as with the earthier side of human nature. He hated anything savoring of sentimentalism, affectation, or pretense..."

In his 27 October 1933 letter to the Stornoway Gazette, Skye-born Seanchaidh John N. MacLeod (1880–1954), recalled of Fr. MacDonald,

"'The man myself' never found a place in Fr Allan's heart, and that is surely one of the reasons why the people of the Highlands and Islands in particular loved him so well."

Folklore collector
MacDonald began collecting folklore when he was assigned to Oban shortly after his ordination. From Donald MacLeod, a fisherman and parishioner of St Columba's Cathedral from the Isle of Eigg, Fr. MacDonald collected multiple Catholic hymns in Scottish Gaelic. He supplemented these with several of his own compositions and translations and anonymously published a Gaelic hymnal in 1893.

Following his assignment to St. Peter's Church in South Uist, Fr. Allan's mentor, Fr. Alexander Campbell, urged him to continue his collecting work and to pay close attention to the Hebridean mythology and folklore of South Uist. Fr. Campbell, who had assisted legendary folklorist Alexander Carmichael collect what was published in Carmina Gadelica, often used to tell Fr. Allan MacDonald, "My boy, when you've ploughed what I've harrowed, you'll believe more things."

Fr. MacDonald, a lifelong admirer of the Jacobite movement, was an expert in the history of the Jacobite rising of 1745. His manuscripts are still preserved and, although unpublished, remain a rich source of Scottish mythology and history.

According to John Lorne Campbell, "His folklore collections, much of which have still to be published, run to hundreds of thousands of words, probably the greatest collection of folklore connected with one definite locality ever made by one person. He enjoyed the friendship and respect of many noted scholars in Scotland and Ireland who did not hesitate to ask him frequently the kind of questions that can only be answered by the man on the spot. He left, amongst other things, a vocabulary of South Uist Gaelic and a short diary in Gaelic, which has been printed in the quarterly magazine Gairm, and many original poems."

Fr. MacDonald supplied most of the material that was published by Ada Goodrich Freer who was commissioned to investigate Hebridean folklore about second sight by the Society for Psychical Research in 1894–1895. Goodrich Freer published reports under own name, in the journal Folklore and gave almost no credit to Fr. MacDonald, for which she received very harsh criticism from both Dr. George Henderson and Alexander Carmichael.

After the rediscovery of Father Allan's diary and notebooks, John Lorne Campbell also became aware that almost all of Goodrich Freer's research had been supplied, without the proper credit or acknowledgement, by Fr. Allan MacDonald. According to Ray Penman, "Reading through the diaries, John found several references to work Fr Allan was doing to provide material for Miss Freer's lectures, sometimes working late to meet her deadlines at the expense of his own failing health. With painstaking thoroughness, John and Sheila Lockett went through Ada Goodrich Freer's lectures, papers, and book and compared them against Fr Allan's notebooks. They discovered at least two dozen instances of outright plagiarism, sometimes of extensive passages with only small changes of words. Sometimes she blatantly misrepresented his findings. To support her argument that 'second sight' existed on the islands, she reproduced his retellings of folk memories as if they had happened recently. Where he added qualifications, she substituted certainties."

When Campbell went public with his findings about the degree to which Ada Goodrich Freer owed her entire reputation as a pioneer folklorist to the research of Fr. Allan MacDonald, Campbell's writings were, "not universally well-received. Despite the evidence, some academics and folklorists believed that John had overstepped the bonds of decency in attacking the reputation of a dead women. He countered by arguing that only be destroying Miss Freer's reputation could he rescue that of Fr Allan, whose notes had been plundered to such an extent that the publication of his own work had been stifled. To add insult to injury, Miss Freer had claimed copyright of the material in her book and papers."

Poet
According to Roger Hutchinson, the life of a 19th century priest in the Western Islands was a solitary one, particularly for, "young men who had travelled widely and studied deeply". As Catholic islands such as South Uist and Barra had, "no lending libraries, no scientific and literary associations, very few newspapers, and only occasional mail", parish priests of the era needed to find personal hobbies. Some priests hunted and fished, others played football, shinty, chess, or card games. Others, like Fr. MacDonald, collected from the local oral tradition and wrote poetry. For this reason, Fr. MacDonald later wrote about two young men studying for the priesthood, "It would be satisfactory to know that each of them had a liking for some bye-study. Such a study is a lifelong joy and recreation, and needed where one is isolated."

Religious poetry
MacDonald's poetry is mainly Christian poetry, as would be expected from one of his calling. He composed Scottish Gaelic Christmas carols, hymns and verse in honour of the Blessed Virgin, the Christ Child, and the Blessed Sacrament. In many of his Christmas poems, however, Fr. MacDonald points out that the Christ child came to earth and was not greeted by joyfulness, but by religious persecution and hatred by the human race.

Fr. MacDonald also translated the Tridentine Mass and Latin hymns and religious poetry into Gaelic verse; including Thomas of Celano's Dies irae, Stabat Mater, Ave Maris Stella, A solis ortus cardine, Te lucis ante terminum, and Salve Regina.

According to John Lorne Campbell, "He was quick to see the immense interest, both religious and secular, of the vast but sometimes ignorantly despised Gaelic oral tradition, of which Uist was then, as it is now, the main storehouse, and his efforts to rescue what he could from the danger of oblivion and to incorporate the traditional religious material into modern devotional literature were worthy of the greatest praise."

For this reason, Fr MacDonald's original religious poetry was also made as an effort to fill gaps in the oral tradition of the Outer Hebrides. For example, Fr. MacDonald was told that a catechism in Gaelic oral poetry had been routinely memorized before Catholic Emancipation in 1829 by the children of South Uist. As no one could be found who could still recite the missing catechism to him from memory, Fr. MacDonald decided to recreate it instead of transcribing it. He accordingly composed a series of "didactic hymns", which are both a translation into Gaelic and a versification of A Catechism of Christian Doctrine, the famous "Penny Catechism" by Bishop Richard Challoner.

Furthermore, in his song-poem An Eaglais ("The Church"), Fr. MacDonald drew upon the ancient metaphor of the Catholic Church as the Barque of St. Peter, adapted it to the culture of the Outer Hebrides, and reimagined Jesus Christ as a Hebridean shipwright. Furthermore, Fr. MacDonald, who was always interested in adapting the traditions of Gaelic oral literature to religious instruction, composed this poem after the style of a Waulking song.

Furthermore, as both a musical accompaniment for Low Mass and as an alternative to Calvinist worship, which retains in the Gàidhealtachd the 16th century practice of exclusive and unaccompanied Gaelic psalm singing in a form called precenting the line, Fr. MacDonald composed a series of sung Gaelic paraphrases of Catholic doctrine about what is taking place during the Tridentine Mass. These paraphrases continued to be routinely sung during Mass upon Benbecula, Barra, South Uist and Eriskay until the aftermath of the Second Vatican Council. Even though the same basic melodies were used by Catholic Gaels on every island, each parish developed its own distinctive style of singing them.

Fr. Mark Dilworth, who did not know of this custom, later recalled that when he first said Mass upon South Uist during the 1950s he was shocked to hear the congregation behind him spontaneously break into song. Fr. Dilworth later recalled that he found the custom, "very distracting."

The sung texts and the tunes were both transcribed based on recordings made during the 1970s at St. Peter's Roman Catholic Church in Daliburgh, South Uist. They were published for the first time with musical notation in the 2002 bilingual Mungo Books edition of Fr. Allan MacDonald's poetry and songs.

Secular poetry
However, several secular poems and songs were also composed by him.

For example, in his iconic song poem Eilein na h-Òige ("Island of the Young"), Fr. MacDonald praises the beauty of Eriskay, its wildlife, and the fondness of its people for telling tales from the Fenian Cycle of Celtic mythology inside the ceilidh house. He also commented upon the visits to Eriskay by Saint Columba, Iain Muideartach, Chief of Clanranald, and Prince Charles Edward Stuart. Fr. MacDonald also denounced the Highland Clearances upon the island, but expressed joy that the crofters had been granted greater rights against the landlords.

In his comic verse drama, Parlamaid nan Cailleach ("The Parliament of Hags"), however, Fr. MacDonald lampoons the backbiting and gossiping of his female parishioners and local courtship and marriage customs. Ronald Black has compared the play to similar works of comic poetry from Irish literature in the Irish language, such as Domhnall Ó Colmáin's 1670 Párliament na mBan ("The Women's Parliament") and Brian Merriman's 1780 Cúirt an Mheán Oíche ("The Midnight Court").

His poem Banais nan Cambeulach ("The Campbell Wedding"), was composed about the 7 February 1899 marriage of his housekeeper, Kate Campbell, to crofter and fisherman Donald Campbell. Father MacDonald irately skewers Clan Campbell over the Massacre of Glencoe and for repeatedly siding against the House of Stuart during the Jacobite risings. He also compared Donald Campbell's marriage to his housekeeper to the centuries-old Clan Campbell tradition of cattle raiding, the aftermath of which often left Fr. MacDonald's Clan Donald ancestors similarly destitute. While the priest further expressed a deep sense of chagrin that the bride and groom would be giving birth to more Campbells, Fr. MacDonald ended the poem by offering the couple his warmest blessings and good wishes.

John Lorne Campbell later wrote, however, "The late Ewen MacLennan who kept the shop at Eriskay from 1890 to 1900 and was present at the Campbell wedding, told me he did not recollect its being recited."

MacDonald's secular verse, it is accordingly believed, was written for his own amusement and was never intended to see publication.

Legacy

Despite the decades of obscurity that followed his death, interest in Fr. Allan MacDonald continued. American ethnomusicologist Margaret Fay Shaw credited the beginning of her lifelong passion for collecting Gaelic songs from traditional singers in both Scotland and Nova Scotia to when she was a teenaged student at St. Bride's boarding school in Helensburgh, near Glasgow. The school was treated to a recital by Marjory Kennedy-Fraser, who sang, "her own Anglicized versions", of the Gaelic songs she had collected with the help of Fr. Allan MacDonald. According to Ray Perman, her husband's biographer, "The songs entranced Margaret, but at the same time she was aware that there must be more to them and determined that one day she would hear the originals."

During her first tour of the Highlands and Islands in 1926, Fay-Shaw made a deliberate point of visiting Eriskay and paying her respects at the grave of Fr. Allan MacDonald.

The primary credit, however, for rescuing Fr. Allan MacDonald from obscurity and restoring both his reputation and importance to Scottish Gaelic literature, must go to Margaret Fay-Shaw's husband, literary scholar and Scottish nationalist John Lorne Campbell. Campbell's research into Fr. MacDonald began in 1936, after being asked by Outlook magazine to review the second edition of musicologist Amy Murray's memoir Father Allan's Island. Campbell, despite having been raised in the Scottish Episcopal Church, "was very drawn to Father Allan", about whom he heard very high praise from residents of South Uist, Eriskay, and Barra who had known him.

While reading Amy Murray's memoir, Campbell learned that Fr. MacDonald folklore studies, poetry, and other unpublished writings had filled ten notebooks, many more than Campbell had thought. Campbell then decided to begin a search for them. In 1937, Campbell discovered a Fr. MacDonald notebook entitled Stange Things in his friend Compton Mackenzie's personal library in Barra. Campbell immediately borrowed the notebook and began to transcribe it, his quest for the remaining notebooks was interrupted by the outbreak of the Second World War.

It was only after John Lorne Campbell was received into the Catholic Church inside St. Ninian's Cathedral in Antigonish, Nova Scotia in 1946, however, that his fascination with Fr. Allan MacDonald ripened into an obsession.

According to his biographer Ray Penman, "Over 20 years John was to devote a considerable amount of time and money to tracing the work of Fr. Allan, publishing much of it for the first time, righting wrongs he believed had been done to the priest and writing a short biography. The more he learned of him and read his work, the more he identified with him."

With the help of various friends and the universities of Glasgow and Edinburgh, Campbell succeeded in tracking down the poetry manuscripts, diaries, and detailed folklore collections of Fr. Allan MacDonald, which had been missing and presumed lost since his death in 1905. As word spread, others shared surviving letters to and from Fr Allan. Further detailed research by Campbell about Fr. MacDonald's life, times, and writings, as well as his diary, was similarly collected and housed at Canna, in the Inner Hebrides of Scotland.

According to Ray Penman, "Together they revealed a life's work by a diligent and sensitive man who not only faithfully recorded the stories and songs of others, but himself wrote poetry in Gaelic and English and translated hymns and a Mass into Gaelic. But why had none of this been published under Fr Allan's own name at the time?"

The first collection of Fr. MacDonald's Gaelic verse, Bàrdachd Mghr Ailein: The Gaelic Poems of Fr Allan McDonald of Eriskay (1859–1905), was self published by John Lorne Campbell in 1965. In 1966, future Gaelic literary scholar Ronald Black received a suitcase full of Gaelic books from Dr. Campbell and brought them to Eriskay for sale aboard a ferry from Ludag, South Uist. At the time, Eriskay still had many Scottish Gaelic monoglot speakers who had known Fr. MacDonald personally. Black has since recalled that the poetry book and Campbell's "little blue biography of Father Allan", both accordingly, "sold like hotcakes".

At the urging of Ferdi McDermott of Saint Austin Press, an expanded and bilingual anthology of the priest's Gaelic verse, both religious and secular, was edited by Ronald Black and was published in 2002 by Mungo Books, which was then the Scottish imprint of Saint Austin Press. Ronald Black commented, however, that so much of Fr. MacDonald's poetry remains unpublished that the Mungo Books edition could easily have been twice as long.

For example, Fr. MacDonald's Ecclesiastical Latin to Scottish Gaelic literary translation of the Compline service from the Roman Breviary, the manuscript of which John Lorne Campbell located in the possession of Canon William MacMaster at Fort William in 1950, remains unpublished.

South Uist vocalist Kathleen MacInnes performed Fr. MacDonald's literary translation of Fr. Frederick William Faber's Marian hymn "O Purest of Creatures", on her 2006 album Summer Dawn.

Quotes
 Diary entry 13 February 1898:  "Rough, gloomy weather, as is usual in early February; white spindrift off the sandbanks driven everywhere; spray like ashes driven across the Sound; sod and slate loosened by the quick blows of the wind. Fierce squalls from the north shaking every gable, hard hailstones which would cut the top of one's ears, men so chilled with cold that they cannot look outside huddled indoors at the edge of the ashes. The head of yonder hill above is sheathed in a shroud, since the cold has killed her natural virtues. She has lost her appearance entirely, the sleep of death has come on her, and there is no likelihood of her moving until the warmth of spring unbinds her."
 Diary entry 22 February 1898: "Read Rob Donn for vocabulary purposes. His vocabulary is more valuable than his poetry. His subjects are often enough coarse and treated coarsely. His reputation is greater than his merits. I should never dream of comparing him with W. Ross or Alasdair. Even Alein Dall is superior to him in rhyme, rhythm, and humour... Took up W. Ross and read pieces. His vocabulary has not so many strange words as Rob Donn's Reay Country Gaelic... He makes you feel with him and for him. Pity for the language that he died so young."
 Diary entry 25 March 1898: "Our Lady's Day of St Patrick's, The noblest day that has been or will come. Twenty-five years since my father died, and I offered up the sacrifice of the Mass for his soul. The north-east wind blows on."

Published works
 Published anonymously (1889), Laoidhean Caitliceach airson Chloine, Oban, republished 1936.
 Published anonymously (1893), Comh-Chruinneachadh de Laoidhean Spioradail, Oban. Contains Gaelic hymns, like Tàladh Chrìosda, which were collected from the oral tradition, as well as original hymns and literary translations by Fr. MacDonald.
Collected by Fr. Allan MacDonald (1958), Gaelic Words from South Uist – Edited, Dublin Institute for Advanced Studies. Second edition with supplement, published by the Oxford University Press, N.D 1972. [CH2/1/1/13]
 Edited and transcribed by John Lorne Campbell (1965), Bàrdachd Mhgr Ailein: The Gaelic Poems of Fr Allan McDonald of Eriskay (1859–1905), Privately printed. [CH2/1/1/13]
Eilein na h-Òige; The Poems of Fr. Allan MacDonald, Edited by Ronald Black, Mungo Books, Glasgow, 2002.

References

Further reading

Books

Periodicals
 John Lorne Campbell, The Sources of the Gaelic Hymnal, 1893, The Innes Review, 1956 Vol. VII p. 101.
 Fr. Allan MacDonald, translated by Ronald Black, A Christmas Hymn: May the Trinity be Praised, St Austin Review (December 2001), page 2.

External links
John Lorne Campbell's Biography of Fr. Allan MacDonald
Roman Catholic Diocese of Argyll and the Isles

1859 births
1905 deaths
19th-century musicologists
19th-century Scottish Gaelic poets
19th-century Scottish Roman Catholic priests
19th-century Scottish writers
20th-century Scottish Gaelic poets
20th-century Scottish poets
20th-century Scottish Roman Catholic priests
Catholic liturgical music
Celtic Christianity
Allan
Clan MacDonald of Keppoch
Collectors of fairy tales
Deaths from pneumonia in Scotland
History of human rights
History of the Scottish Highlands
Modernist poets
People from Lochaber
People from Fort William, Highland
Poet priests
Scottish Catholic poets
Scottish diarists
Scottish folk-song collectors
Scottish folklorists
Scottish human rights activists
Scottish male poets
Scottish Roman Catholic hymnwriters
Scottish satirists
Symbolist poets
Translators from Latin
Translators to Scottish Gaelic
Victorian poets